{{DISPLAYTITLE:C18H20O2}}
The molecular formula C18H20O2 (molar mass : 268.35 g/mol) may refer to:

 Bisphenol Z
 Dianin's compound
 Dianol
 Diethylstilbestrol
 17α-Dihydroequilenin
 17β-Dihydroequilenin
 8,9-Dehydroestrone
 Equilin
 Hippulin
 4-Methyl-2,4-bis(4-hydroxyphenyl)pent-1-ene
 Trendione